Tipula ultima is a species of crane fly in the family Tipulidae.  It was originally named Tipula flavescens by Fabricius in 1805.  That name was preoccupied and Alexander proposed a new name ultima in 1915.  Ultima is Latin for last; the species flies late in the year.

References

Further reading

External links

 Diptera.info

Tipulidae